Palwal  is a city and a municipal council. It is the headquarters of Palwal district, the 21st district of Haryana state in northern India. It is a centre of the cotton trade in the area. It is also a part of National Capital Region.

Etymology and legend

The origin of Palwal is related to the local legend related to the Mahabharata, according to which the town is named after an asura called "Palwasura" who was slain by Balarama, the brother of Krishna. To commemorate this event an annual festival called "Baldev Chhat Ka Mela" is held here, and a "Dauji temple" in honor of Balrama is situated in Banchari village 25 km from Palwal on Grand Trunk Road.

History
The local tradition identifies Palwal with the Apelava town mentioned in the Mahabharata, which was later restored by Vikramaditya.

Matia Fort or Palwal Fort was built during the Sher Shah Suri's time. Excavations have unearthed evidence of a grand palace at the bottom of the fort. As of 2021, it lies in ruins.

A historical building by the name 'Gandhi Seva Ashram' and a Museum was made in the memory of Mahatma Gandhi. The Gandhi Museum is close to Palwal Railway Station. Mahatma Gandhi was arrested on 10 April 1919 at Palwal railway station while going to Punjab against the Rowlatt Act. Keeping this memory alive lasting on October 2, 1938, Netaji Subhas Chandra Bose had kept it. Gandhi exhibition was established in Gandhi Seva Ashram in the year 1962. In it, history related to Gandhiji was preserved. Pictures for the exhibition were brought from the National Gandhi Museum of Delhi. Later, they started getting damaged, they were upgraded and the exhibition site was changed to the museum.

Post-independence

On 15 August 1979, Gurgaon district was further divided to form a new Faridabad district, and Palwal became a part of it. On 15 August 2008, Palwal became the administrative headquarters of the newly formed Palwal district, the 21st district of Haryana.

Geography

Demography

See also

 Administrative divisions of Haryana

References

External links

History of Haryana

 
Cities and towns in Palwal district